Jets'n'Guns 2 is a 2020 2D side-scrolling shooter developed and published by Czech studio Rake in Grass and the sequel to the 2004 game Jets'n'Guns. It was released on 24 July 2020 for Microsoft Windows, and on 26 August 2020 for Nintendo Switch.

Development
The game was announced in November 2016 as a sequel to 2004 video game. Early access version was released on Steam on 11 December 2018. Soundtrack for the game is provided by Machinae Supremacy. Full version was released on 24 July 2020 for Windows and on 26 August 2020 for Nintendo Switch.

Gameplay

Gameplay is very similar to previous game. It is a  2D side-scrolling shoot 'em up game in which players task is to reach end of the level. 

Between levels, players are given the option to buy upgrades for their ship. Some of the most vital upgrades are for maneuverability, speed, health/armor and cooling. They can also give their ship a new paint job for free. Another item is the Atarix, which gives players a chance to unlock crates found when they destroy transport ships during a mission. There are several upgrades that boost the ship's defense and provide slow armor regeneration, such as shields and nanomachines. Other upgrades give players bounties for killing certain enemies, and bonuses for mass killings of enemy troops. There are also upgrades that allow players to customize up to five different weapon profiles, which can be switched mid-game, or allow players to change the angle of their weapons to adapt to changing strategic situations.

As the game progresses, more weapons and items are made available. The fighter the player starts with only has slots for two front weapons and rather limited ship upgrades. The TMIG-226 has slots for one bombing system, one missile system, three front weapons, and one rear weapon. Some weapons can only be used in the front or rear slots. There is a large variety of weapons, ranging from flamethrowers to electro-balls to acid guns. Most weapons can be upgraded after they are bought. This may enhance power, projectile velocity, rate of fire, or the nature of the attack itself. When viewing the status of an individual weapon, meters are shown that indicate its power, heat generation and speed ratings.

Most weapons give off heat when fired, indicated by a heating gauge. This heat dissipates when firing ceases. If the needle passes the orange and then red zones of the gauge the ship overheats, and it will be unable to fire until the needle passes back behind the orange zone. This makes upgrading the cooling system essential. With an improved cooling system, the ship will take longer to overheat, and will cool down faster. Missiles and bombs do not generate heat. The rate of fire for missiles is determined by their upgrade level. Bombs are the only weapons that have a limit pertaining to how many can be fired at any given time. Each bomb that is dropped uses up a portion of a slowly replenishing 'bomb meter'; the amount used by each bomb decreases with upgrades.

References

External links
Official website

2020 video games
Horizontally scrolling shooters
Windows games
Nintendo Switch games
Single-player video games
Video games developed in the Czech Republic
Video game sequels
Rake in Grass games